U.S. Route 31W (US 31W) is the westernmost of two parallel routes for U.S. Route 31 from Nashville, Tennessee to Louisville, Kentucky.  At one time, it split with U.S. Route 31E at Sellersburg, Indiana, crossing into nearby Louisville via the Kentucky & Indiana Terminal Bridge. Tennessee State Route 41 (SR 41) is its unsigned companion route in Tennessee.

During the December 2021 tornado outbreak, an EF-3 tornado devastated stretches of US 31W in Bowling Green, Kentucky.

Route description
US 31W begins in Nashville, at an interchange with Ellington Parkway and US 31 and US 31E. The route continues west as Spring Street, concurrent with US 41/US 431/SR 11. The four highways continue north onto Dickerson Pike, closely paralleling Interstate 24 (I-24)  through Nashville. At an intersection with Trinity Lane, all the routes but US 41 and SR 11 split from US 31W and continue west, while US 31W continues north, away from I-24. The roadway has an interchange with I-65 and SR 155 before an intersection with SR 45 in Bellshire Terrace. The highway passes through Goodlettsville, where US 31W splits from the other two routes and crosses I-65; it also passes through the cities of Millersville, White House, and the western edge of Portland. Before it enters Kentucky, it junctions the recently completed SR 109. 

After several miles, the highway enters the state of Kentucky and crosses I-65 again, where it passes through Franklin and intersects KY 100. From here, the highway is known as Bowling Green Road (Nashville Road) once it enters Warren County, and passes through fields, as well as giving access to the town of Woodburn. Entering the city of Bowling Green, the route intersects Interstate 165 (I-165, formerly the William H. Natcher Parkway) as well as US 231 as the route bypasses downtown Bowling Green. On the eastern side of town, Louisville Road carries US 31W, US 68, and KY 80 east and then northeast, where US 68 and KY 80 split off to the east. US 31W passes within  of an entrance to Mammoth Cave National Park near Park City, after crossing I-65 again, this time without direct access to the freeway. The highway travels through Cave City as Duke Highway while crossing two major state routes, KY 90, and then KY 70.

In the city of Horse Cave, US 31W intersects KY 218; the Dixie Highway then continues on to Munfordville before crossing I-65 for a fifth time at the interstate's exit 65 interchange, and paralleling it closely to the west and later, the east. Between Upton and Sonora, it crosses over I-65 for a sixth time. In Elizabethtown, US 31W intersects with the Wendell H. Ford Western Kentucky Parkway before crossing I-65 for a seventh time. The route continue through the heart of Elizabethtown, intersecting US 62, before it goes on to enter Radcliff. It also passes through Fort Knox near Radcliff, within sight of the United States Bullion Depository. US 31W overlaps with US 60 from Muldraugh to Louisville, paralleling the Ohio River briefly before an interchange with I-264 (Watterson Expressway) in Louisville. US 31W continues as a one-way pair consisting of 22nd and Dr. W. J. Hodges streets, and later Main and Market streets in downtown Louisville. At 2nd Street, US 31W ends at US 31E, and the two routes continue north as US 31 before crossing the Ohio River into Jeffersonville, in Clark County, Indiana.

History

Most of US 31W's route was part of the old Dixie Highway from the National Auto Trail program, the predecessor to the United States Numbered Highways system. Many of the cities through which US 31W traverses still give it a local street name of "Dixie Highway" or "Dixie Avenue." Some portions date back further, to the Louisville and Nashville Turnpike, which began construction in the 1830s. Prior to the creation of the highway system, the route in Tennessee from US 41E to the Kentucky state line was signed as State Route 79.

US 31W once terminated in Sellersburg, Indiana. It went into New Albany, Indiana, crossing the Kentucky & Indiana Terminal Bridge into Louisville, concurrent with U.S. Route 150. When the K&I Terminal Bridge was closed to traffic in 1979, US 31W and US 150 were rerouted onto the Sherman Minton Bridge, being concurrent with Interstate 64 until Exit 121. In 1980, AASHTO truncated both termini of US 31E and US 31W to Louisville. In Indiana, US 31W was replaced by SR 311.

31W Treasure Hunt
The 31W Treasure Hunt is an outdoor second-hand sale held annually for three days beginning the second Thursday in September. It takes place along the alignment of U.S. Route 31W in its entirety from Nashville to Louisville.

Major intersections

Tennessee State Route 41

State Route 41 (SR 41) runs as a secret, or hidden designation, throughout US 31W’s routing from the US 41 (SR 11) junction in Goodlettsville to the SR 259 junction at the Kentucky state line near Mitchellville.

Special routes

Bowling Green bypass

From the 1950s to the 1980s, a bypass route of US 31W ran around Bowling Green, Kentucky. It was replaced by rerouting US 31W onto the bypass.

Elizabethtown bypass

US Route 31W By-Pass is a four-lane expressway in Elizabethtown, Kentucky. It starts at an at-grade intersection with Kentucky Route 1136, bypasses the west side of town and it ends at another at-grade intersection with US Route 31W on the northern side of Elizabethtown. The southern end can be reached via either KY 1136 on the south side, or following the Western KY Parkway from the at-grade intersection with US 31W/KY 61to the interchange after the WK Parkway/I-65 junction.

Major intersections include:
Kentucky Route 1136 (Glendale Road)
Western Kentucky Parkway (exit 135)
U.S. Route 62 (Leitchfield Road)
Kentucky Route 361 (Patriot Parkway)
U.S. Route 31W (Dixie Highway)

Elizabethtown Truck Route 

U.S. Route 31W Truck is a truck route in Elizabethtown. Its component highways include the Wendell H. Ford Western Kentucky Parkway west from the US 31W/KY 61 junction to exit 135, and the final  of the US 31W Bypass from the WK Parkway exit 135 interchange to US 31W on the north side of town.

West Point Business Route 

U.S. Route 31W Business is a business route located in West Point, Kentucky, in northern Hardin County.

See also

Roads in Louisville, Kentucky
Roads in Nashville, Tennessee

References

External links

External links

W
31 W
31 W
31 W
Dixie Highway
031 W
031 W
031 W
031 W
0031 W
0031 W
0031 W
0031 W
0031 W
0031 W
0031 W
0031 W
0031 W
0031 W